Duško Radinović (Serbian Cyrillic: Душко Радиновић; born 8 February 1963) is a Montenegrin retired footballer.

Club career
He is best known for his spell with Red Star Belgrade in the early 1990s, being part of the side's European Cup victory although he did not feature in the final. He also won the Intercontinental Cup 1991, in which he played the whole game.

International career
He was included by Yugoslavia national football team to UEFA Euro 1992, but the nation would be suspended due to the Yugoslav Wars.

References

External links
 

1963 births
Living people
Footballers from Podgorica
Association football defenders
Yugoslav footballers
Montenegrin footballers
Serbia and Montenegro footballers
OFK Titograd players
FK Sutjeska Nikšić players
Red Star Belgrade footballers
Degerfors IF players
IK Brage players
IFK Malmö Fotboll players
Yugoslav First League players
First League of Serbia and Montenegro players
Allsvenskan players
Serbia and Montenegro expatriate footballers
Expatriate footballers in Sweden
Serbia and Montenegro expatriate sportspeople in Sweden